This is a comprehensive listing of awards won by Powderfinger, an alternative rock band who were based in Brisbane, Australia. The band formed in 1989 in Brisbane, and their lineup since 1992 consisted of Bernard Fanning, John Collins, Ian Haug, Darren Middleton and Jon Coghill.

Powderfinger is highly successful in the Australian recording industry, being a recipient of the industry's flagship awards, the Australian Recording Industry Association Music Awards, eighteen times. The group has also topped the Triple J Hottest 100 chart twice, and had a total of 21 entries listed. The group has also received three awards from the Australasian Performing Right Association, four Jack Awards, and four Music Industry Critics' Awards.

ARIA Awards 
Powderfinger has won eighteen ARIA Awards from the Australian Recording Industry Association, from forty-seven nominations, over a period of sixteen years. In particular, Powderfinger has received the "Best Cover Art" award several times, including for Odyssey Number Five in 2001, and for Vulture Street in 2003. Powderfinger has also won the award for "Best Group" twice, and has been nominated six times. The awards are presented annually by the Australian Recording Industry Association.

APRA Awards 
Powderfinger has won multiple APRA Awards from the Australasian Performing Right Association, including "Songwriter of the Year" in 2004. The band has also won "Song of the Year" twice, in 2000 and 2001.

Helpmann Awards
The Helpmann Awards is an awards show, celebrating live entertainment and performing arts in Australia, presented by industry group Live Performance Australia since 2001. Note: 2020 and 2021 were cancelled due to the COVID-19 pandemic.
 

! 
|-
| 2011
|  Sunsets The Farewell Tour
| Helpmann Award for Best Australian Contemporary Concert
| 
| 
|-

Mo Awards
The Australian Entertainment Mo Awards (commonly known informally as the Mo Awards), were annual Australian entertainment industry awards. They recognise achievements in live entertainment in Australia from 1975 to 2016. Powderfinger won two awards in that time.
 (wins only)
|-
| 1999
| Powderfinger
| Rock Performers of the Year
| 
|-
| 2000
| Powderfinger
| Contemporary Rock Performers of the Year
| 
|-

Triple J Hottest 100 
Powderfinger has appeared in Triple J's Hottest 100 22 times, as well as appearing on five CD releases and one DVD release. Of their nineteen appearances, they topped the chart twice; in 1999 with "These Days", and in 2000 with "My Happiness". "My Happiness" and "These Days" also appeared on CD releases in their respective years.

Other awards and achievements 

In 1999, the band won four awards at the annual Music Industry Critics' Awards (see right), and Internationalist was voted one of the "Best 100 Albums" of the 1990s by JUICE magazine.

Powderfinger has received four Jack Awards from Bourbon whiskey producers Jack Daniels. In 2004, Powderfinger won "Best Live Band" and "Best Live Performance" for the group on Rove, and Jon Coghill won "Best Drummer". In 2005, the group won "Best Tour Art" for their tour The Revolution.

In 2004, Powderfinger were named the "Most Broadcast Act" of the year by the Phonographic Performance Company of Australia.

In 2011, Powderfinger's album "Odyssey Number Five" was voted number one in Triple J's Hottest 100 Australian Albums of all-time music poll.

See also

 Powderfinger discography–includes chart rankings and album certifications.

References 
Notes

A. ^ Powderfinger tracks have been ranked as #1 on Triple J Hottest 100 charts twice, and have been ranked in other positions 21 times.

Citations

Awards
Lists of awards received by Australian musician
Lists of awards received by musical group